Auguste Mallet (3 May 1913 – 9 December 1946) was a French racing cyclist. He rode in the 1938 Tour de France.

References

1913 births
1946 deaths
French male cyclists
Place of birth missing